Hamidaniyeh (also Romanized as Ḩamīdānīyeh; also known as Ḩamīdānīyeh-ye Kūchak and Humaidania) is a village in Mollasani Rural District, in the Central District of Bavi County, Khuzestan Province, Iran. At the 2006 census, its population was 154, in 31 families.

References 

Populated places in Bavi County